Michael Jones  was an Anglican priest in Ireland.

Jones educated at Trinity College, Dublin. He was Archdeacon of Killala  from 1625 until his death in 1719.

Notes

Alumni of Trinity College Dublin
18th-century Irish Anglican priests
17th-century Irish Anglican priests
1719 deaths
Archdeacons of Killala